Bimmy may refer to:

A nautical term for a punitive instrument, used in flagellation
A misspelling of the name "Billy" in the video game Double Dragon III: The Sacred Stones